In internationalization, CJK characters is a collective term for the Chinese, Japanese, and Korean languages, all of which include Chinese characters and derivatives in their writing systems, sometimes paired with other scripts. Collectively, the CJK characters often include Hànzì in Chinese, Kanji and Kana in Japanese, Hanja and Hangul in Korean. Vietnamese can be included, making the abbreviation CJKV, as Vietnamese historically used Chinese characters in which they were known as Chữ Hán and Chữ Nôm in Vietnamese (Hán-Nôm altogether).

Character repertoire 
Standard Mandarin Chinese and Standard Cantonese are written almost exclusively in Chinese characters. Over 3,000 characters are required for general literacy, with up to 40,000 characters for reasonably complete coverage. Japanese uses fewer characters—general literacy in Japanese can be expected with 2,136 characters. The use of Chinese characters in Korea is increasingly rare, although idiosyncratic use of Chinese characters in proper names requires knowledge (and therefore availability) of many more characters. Even today, however, South Korean students are taught 1,800 characters.

Other scripts used for these languages, such as bopomofo and the Latin-based pinyin for Chinese, hiragana and katakana for Japanese, and hangul for Korean, are not strictly "CJK characters", although CJK character sets almost invariably include them as necessary for full coverage of the target languages.

The sinologist Carl Leban (1971) produced an early survey of CJK encoding systems.

Until the early 20th century, Classical Chinese was the written language of government and scholarship in Vietnam. Popular literature in Vietnamese was written in the chữ Nôm script, consisting of Chinese characters with many characters created locally. From 1920s onwards, the script since then used for recording literature has been the Latin chữ Quốc ngữ.

Encoding 
The number of characters required for complete coverage of all these languages' needs cannot fit in the 256-character code space of 8-bit character encodings, requiring at least a 16-bit fixed width encoding or multi-byte variable-length encodings. The 16-bit fixed width encodings, such as those from Unicode up to and including version 2.0, are now deprecated due to the requirement to encode more characters than a 16-bit encoding can accommodate—Unicode 5.0 has some 70,000 Han characters—and the requirement by the Chinese government that software in China support the GB 18030 character set.

Although CJK encodings have common character sets, the encodings often used to represent them have been developed separately by different East Asian governments and software companies, and are mutually incompatible. Unicode has attempted, with some controversy, to unify the character sets in a process known as Han unification.

CJK character encodings should consist minimally of Han characters plus language-specific phonetic scripts such as pinyin, bopomofo, hiragana, katakana and hangul.

CJK character encodings include:

 Big5 (the most prevalent encoding before Unicode was implemented)
 CCCII
 CNS 11643 (official standard of Republic of China)
 EUC-JP
 EUC-KR
 GB 2312 (subset and predecessor of GB 18030)
 GB 18030 (mandated standard in the People's Republic of China)
 Giga Character Set (GCS)
 ISO 2022-JP
 KS C 5861
 Shift-JIS
 TRON
 Unicode

The CJK character sets take up the bulk of the assigned Unicode code space. There is much controversy among Japanese experts of Chinese characters about the desirability and technical merit of the Han unification process used to map multiple Chinese and Japanese character sets into a single set of unified characters.

All three languages can be written both left-to-right and top-to-bottom (right-to-left and top-to-bottom in ancient documents), but are usually considered left-to-right scripts when discussing encoding issues.

Legal status 
Libraries cooperated on encoding standards for JACKPHY characters in the early 1980s. According to Ken Lunde, the abbreviation "CJK" was a registered trademark of Research Libraries Group (which merged with OCLC in 2006). The trademark owned by OCLC between 1987 and 2009 has now expired.

See also 
 Chinese character description languages
 Chinese character encoding
 Chinese input methods for computers
 CJK Compatibility Ideographs
 CJK strokes
 CJK Unified Ideographs
 Complex Text Layout languages (CTL)
 Input method editor
 Japanese language and computers
 Korean language and computers
 List of CJK fonts
 Sinoxenic
 Variable-width encoding
 Vietnamese language and computers

References

Works cited

Sources

 DeFrancis, John. The Chinese Language: Fact and Fantasy. Honolulu: University of Hawaii Press, 1990. .
 Hannas, William C. Asia's Orthographic Dilemma. Honolulu: University of Hawaii Press, 1997.  (paperback);  (hardcover).
 Lemberg, Werner: The CJK package for LATEX2ε—Multilingual support beyond babel. TUGboat, Volume 18 (1997), No. 3—Proceedings of the 1997 Annual Meeting.
 Leban, Carl. Automated Orthographic Systems for East Asian Languages (Chinese, Japanese, Korean), State-of-the-art Report, Prepared for the Board of Directors, Association for Asian Studies. 1971.
 Lunde, Ken. CJKV Information Processing. Sebastopol, Calif.: O'Reilly & Associates, 1998. .

External links 
 CJKV: A Brief Introduction
 Lemberg CJK article from above, TUGboat18-3
 On "CJK Unified Ideograph", from Wenlin.com
 FGA: Unicode CJKV character set rationalization

Encodings of Asian languages
Languages of East Asia
Natural language and computing
Chinese-language computing
Japanese-language computing
Korean-language computing
ja:CJKV